Palm Beach Seafood Restaurant is a Singaporean restaurant that first began along Upper East Coast Road in  Singapore, with its owners credited with inventing and developing the popular local dish, the Singaporean chili crab.  

Founded as a pushcart roadside stall in 1956, it became a permanent restaurant six years later in 1962. Since 2008, the restaurant has been located at the Downtown Core district of Singapore, being located at the One Fullerton mall along Fullerton Road and across the Fullerton Hotel, which is located close to the main Merlion statue at Merlion Park.

History

Early years
Palm Beach Seafood Restaurant began as a pushcart roadside stall in 1956 by Cher Yam Tian and her husband Lim Choo Ngee. 

Cher, who is said to be the creator of the local chilli crab dish, sold stir-fried crabs mixed with bottled chilli and tomato sauce at the stall. The couple eventually expanded their business to establish a restaurant, Palm Beach Seafood Restaurant, along Upper East Coast Road in the early 1960s. The restaurant was named Palm Beach, as there were coconut palms along the beach just outside the restaurant. Up until 1985, they had remained at a coffee-shop along Upper East Coast Road, holding a menu of 9 different crab dishes variations.

Retirement and handover
When Cher and Lim retired in the 1980s, Palm Beach Seafood Restaurant was eventually bought over by Han Jin Juan. In 1985, Palm Beach merged with the Fisherman restaurant and moved to Halifax Road at Newton. After the premises were burned down in a fire, Palm Beach relocated to the National Stadium at the Kallang Riverside Park in October 1985.

Current location
In 2008, they moved to One Fullerton along Fullerton Road, and they have remained there to the present day. Today, their One Fullerton restaurant mainly attracts a crowd of working professionals in the city and tourists.

Company Profile
Today, Palm Beach Seafood Restaurant offers more than 100 items on their menu, with chilli crab  being their signature dish.

As the current owner and managing director, Han Jin Juan keeps himself up to date on the latest trends, which helps to develop Palm Beach’s menu. Head Chef, Wong Ah Kun, runs the kitchen and has worked at Palm Beach for 20 years. According to Chef Wong, Palm Beach takes pride in ensuring that they “keep their recipes consistent and do not compromise on food quality.”

Company Practices
To help increase productivity, Palm Beach has implemented some of the following initiatives:		
In 2005, restaurant staff carried PDAs to transmit orders wirelessly. To improve efficiency, the restaurant upgraded its mobile point of sales (POS) system to take orders via tablet computers instead of PDAs in 2011.  To gather customer feedback, guests are also handed the tablets at the end of every meal.
The restaurant had adopted the 5S methodology system, a housekeeping technique for kitchens, in 2008. With items clearly labeled and sorted, staff can retrieve items quickly, helping to reduce the amount of time spent training new staff. 
Palm Beach is the first Singaporean restaurant to launch the Mystery Diner programme in 2005, in collaboration with the Restaurant Association of Singapore (RAS) and SPRING Singapore. The mystery diner audit is a means for the company to improve service standards.

As a result of these initiatives, Han reported that his company’s profits had grown between 10 and 15 per cent annually, from 2008 to 2012.

Notable projects
In 1994, Palm Beach ventured into the franchise business and awarded their first franchise to an Indonesian company, Sinovo Foods.

In 2008, Palm Beach restaurant collaborated with other notable local seafood restaurants, Jumbo Seafood and Seafood International, to start up two Singapore Seafood Republic outlets in Tokyo, featuring Singapore seafood dishes. After the success of their first two restaurants in Tokyo, they set up other outlets in Singapore (2010), Osaka (2011) and Tokyo (2013).

Awards
Selected awards achieved by Palm Beach restaurant:

See also
List of seafood restaurants
Long Beach Seafood Restaurant

References

External links
Official site – Palm Beach Seafood Restaurant

Restaurant chains in Singapore
Seafood restaurants
Singaporean brands